Wayne Dickens is a former American football player and coach. He served as the head football coach at Kentucky State University from 2009 to 2012 and The College of New Jersey (TCNJ) from 2013 to 2015, compiling a career college football coaching record of 28–42.

Raised in Orange, New Jersey, Dickens played as a center / linebacker at Orange High School.

Head coaching record

References

Year of birth missing (living people)
Living people
Hamilton Tiger-Cats coaches
Kentucky State Thorobreds football coaches
Orange High School (New Jersey) alumni
Players of American football from New Jersey
People from Orange, New Jersey
Rutgers Scarlet Knights football players
San Diego State Aztecs football coaches
Sportspeople from Essex County, New Jersey
TCNJ Lions football coaches
Washington Huskies football coaches
African-American coaches of American football
African-American coaches of Canadian football
21st-century African-American sportspeople